Owens Branch is a stream in Clay County in the U.S. state of Missouri.

Owens Branch has the name of John Cross Owens, an early settler.

See also
List of rivers of Missouri

References

Rivers of Clay County, Missouri
Rivers of Missouri